James F. Albaugh (born May 31, 1950) is the former executive vice president of The Boeing Company and chief executive officer of the Boeing Commercial Airplanes business unit. He served in these capacities for Boeing Commercial Airplanes from September 1, 2009, until his retirement on June 26, 2012. He retired from the company on October 1, 2012. He previously served as president and chief executive officer of the Boeing Defense, Space & Security business unit. Albaugh oversaw a $30.8 billion budget while managing over 70,000 personnel in that position. Albaugh earned $1,499,923 in 2005, making him one of the highest-paid managers in the defense sector.

Early life 
Albaugh graduated from Richland High School in Richland, Washington, in 1968. He received a bachelor's degree in mathematics and physics from Willamette University (1972) and a master's degree in civil engineering from Columbia University.

Career 
In 1975, Albaugh joined Boeing and held various other executive positions. His first assignment at Boeing was at their Richland, Washington operations in 1975. From July 2002 to September 2009 Albaugh was president and CEO of Boeing Integrated Defense Systems (presently named Boeing Defense, Space & Security), a business unit of The Boeing Company. From September 2009 to October 2012, Albaugh was president and CEO of Boeing Commercial Airplanes, a business unit of The Boeing Company. On Oct 1, 2012, Albaugh retired from Boeing Commercial Airplanes.

From December 2012 to July 2016, Albaugh served as a senior advisor to The Blackstone Group.

On September 1, 2016, Albaugh was appointed to the Harris Corporation board of directors.

Honors and awards 
Albaugh is a recipient of the Howard Hughes Memorial Award given "to an aerospace leader whose accomplishments over a long career have contributed significantly to the advancement of aviation or space technology." . He was elected to the National Academy of Engineering in 2011 for technical leadership in defense and commercial aerospace industry.

References

External links
James (Jim) F. Albaugh biography at Boeing in PDF format; archived from the original on December 24, 2016.
James Albaugh biography at Harris Corporation

1950 births
Columbia School of Engineering and Applied Science alumni
Living people
People from Richland, Washington
Willamette University alumni
20th-century American businesspeople
Boeing people